Emanuel David Ginóbili Maccari (born 28 July 1977) is an Argentine former professional basketball player. Over a 23-year professional career, he became one of only two players (along with Bill Bradley) to have won a EuroLeague title, an NBA championship, and an Olympic gold medal. A four-time NBA champion, Ginóbili was a member of the San Antonio Spurs for his entire 16-year NBA career. Along with Spurs teammates Tim Duncan and Tony Parker, he was known as one of the "Big Three". He is often credited for popularizing the Euro step in the NBA. Since September 2021, Ginóbili had been appointed as special advisor to Basketball Operations for the San Antonio Spurs.

Ginóbili comes from a family of professional basketball players. He spent the early part of his career in Argentina and Italy, winning several individual and team honors. His stint with Italian club Kinder Bologna was particularly successful; he won two Italian League MVP awards, the EuroLeague Finals MVP, and the 2001 EuroLeague championship and Triple Crown.

Selected as the 57th overall pick in the 1999 NBA draft, Ginóbili joined the Spurs in 2002 and soon became a key player for the team. In addition to his four NBA championships, Ginóbili was named an All-Star in 2005 and 2011 and was selected twice for the All-NBA Third Team. In 2007–08, he was named the NBA Sixth Man of the Year. Ginóbili announced his retirement from the NBA in August 2018. In April 2022, he was announced as a first ballot inductee into the Naismith Memorial Basketball Hall of Fame. Ginobili is regarded as one of the greatest shooting guards and sixth men in NBA history.

Family and personal life
Ginóbili comes from a family of basketball players. His oldest brother, Leandro, retired in 2003 after seven years in the Argentine basketball league, while brother Sebastián has played in both the Argentine local league and in the Spanish 2nd-tier level Liga Española de Baloncesto. Their father Jorge was a coach at a club in Bahía Blanca, Argentina, where Ginóbili learned to play the game. Given the proliferation of basketball clubs in Bahía Blanca and his idolization of Michael Jordan, Ginóbili's love for basketball grew rapidly.

Ginóbili has dual citizenship in Argentina and Italy, thanks to his Marchesan descent. He speaks Italian and English fluently in addition to his native Spanish. In his free time, Ginóbili enjoys listening to Latin music, watching movies and traveling. In 2004, he married fellow Argentine Marianela Oroño. On 16 May 2010, his wife gave birth to twin boys, Dante and Nicola. On 21 April 2014, his wife gave birth to their third son, Luca.

In the immediate aftermath of the legalization of same-sex marriage in Argentina in 2010, Ginóbili expressed his support for the bill, and added that while supportive of same-sex marriage, he did not "consider himself qualified" to speak about same-sex adoption. He said that he would prefer to see a child being raised by two men or two women rather than to see that child in an orphanage. In March 2020, Ginóbili also expressed support for gay people playing basketball and expressed hope that the issue of sexual orientation will no longer be important soon.

Professional career

Andino (1995–1996)
Ginóbili made his professional debut in the Argentine basketball league for the Andino Sport Club of La Rioja in the 1995–96 season.

Estudiantes de Bahía Blanca (1996–1998) 
Ginóbili was traded to Estudiantes de Bahía Blanca in 1996. He played with his hometown team until 1998.

Viola Reggio Calabria (1998–2000) 
Ginóbili went to Europe to spend the 1998–99 and 1999–2000 seasons with Italian team Basket Viola Reggio Calabria. In 1999, he teamed with Brent Scott, Brian Oliver and Sydney Johnson to earn promotion from the Italian 2nd Division to the Italian 1st Division.

Virtus Bologna (2000–2002) 
Ginóbili then entered the 1999 NBA draft and the San Antonio Spurs selected him late in the second round with the 57th overall pick. However, he did not sign with the Spurs at this point. Instead, he returned to Italy to play for Kinder Bologna, which he helped win the 2001 Italian League Championship, the 2001 and 2002 Italian Cups, and the 2001 EuroLeague, where he was named the 2001 EuroLeague's Finals MVP. He was also named the Italian League MVP in 2000–01 and 2001–02, and made the Italian League's All-Star Game three times during this period.

While playing with the Argentina national team at the 2002 FIBA World Championship in Indianapolis, Ginóbili made the All-Tournament Team, alongside future NBA star Yao Ming and established NBA stars Dirk Nowitzki and Peja Stojaković, and helped lead Argentina to a second-place finish.

San Antonio Spurs (2002–2018)

Early NBA career and first championship (2002–2004)

Ginóbili joined the Spurs for the 2002–03 NBA season, where he played backup for veteran guard Steve Smith. He spent much of the early season injured, and found it hard to adjust to the NBA's style of play. As his injury improved, so did Ginóbili, winning the Western Conference Rookie of the Month in March, and being named to the All-Rookie Second Team at the end of the season. Still, he only started in five games as the Spurs chalked up a 60–22 regular season win–loss record. The Spurs then entered the playoffs eager to upend the defending champions Los Angeles Lakers, at which point Ginóbili rose to prominence.

In contrast to his regular season, Ginóbili became an integral part of Gregg Popovich's rotation in the playoffs, playing in every game. The Spurs eliminated Phoenix and Los Angeles and in those games his scoring threat took opponents by surprise, giving them one more thing to cope with against the now highly favored Spurs. He helped guide them past the Dallas Mavericks in the Western Conference Finals and then the New Jersey Nets in the Finals, securing San Antonio's second championship. After the win, Ginóbili won his first Olimpia de Oro ("Golden Olympia") as Argentina's sportsperson of the year, and met Argentine president Néstor Kirchner. A gym in Bahía Blanca was dedicated in Ginóbili's honor as well.

In the 2003–04 season, the Spurs began featuring Ginóbili more prominently, starting him in half of the 77 regular season games in which he played. His statistics improved in all major categories, as he averaged 12.8 points, 4.5 rebounds, 3.8 assists and 1.8 steals per game. During the 2004 playoffs, the Spurs lost again to the Los Angeles Lakers in the Western Conference Semifinals. Following Game 5 where Derek Fisher scored a buzzer-beating jump shot, the Spurs lost Game 6 and the series 4–2. While Ginóbili did not start in a single playoff game as he did in 2003, his playoff statistics improved significantly, with 13.0 points, 5.3 rebounds and 3.1 assists per game.

Peak years: second and third championships (2004–2011)

After some initial issues with San Antonio over his contract, Ginóbili re-signed with the Spurs and started every game during the 2004–05 season. This was his best season yet as he was selected as a reserve by NBA coaches to the 2005 Western Conference All-Star team, marking his debut in the elite mid-season showcase. During the playoffs, Ginóbili's play was pivotal to winning San Antonio's third championship. The Spurs first defeated Phoenix 4–1 in the Conference Finals, before prevailing in a very defense-oriented seven-game series against the Detroit Pistons. Ginóbili recorded career-highs in his playoff numbers, most notably 20.8 ppg and 5.8 rpg, and had the third-highest point total in the entire playoffs. In the NBA Finals MVP Award voting, the shooting guard was a candidate but was edged out by teammate and captain Tim Duncan. The former finished the 2004–05 season as the second-leading scorer on the team. During the season, he became only the fourth person to win consecutive Olimpias de Oro, this time sharing the award with soccer star Carlos Tevez.

The 2005–06 season was an injury-plagued one for Ginóbili, who suffered foot and ankle injuries that hindered his ability to play. He managed 65 games in the regular season, but saw a dip in major statistics as compared to the previous season. During the playoffs, he returned to form, but was unable to prevent the Spurs from being eliminated by the Dallas Mavericks in the Conference Semifinals.

In the 2006–07 season, the Spurs lacked energy from their reserves. Ginóbili came off the bench for most of the second half of the season, helping the Spurs attain the league's best record during that portion of the season. Ginóbili produced numbers closely identical to his successful 2004–05 campaign despite starting in only 36 of 75 games, his second-lowest number of starts since arriving at San Antonio. The 2007 NBA Playoffs saw him help the Spurs to defeat the Denver Nuggets, Phoenix Suns and Utah Jazz; the team then swept the Cleveland Cavaliers for Ginobili's third and San Antonio's fourth championship.

Ginóbili was to play an even bigger role for the Spurs the following season, reaching career high averages in points, rebounds, assists, and three-point field goal percentage. On 11 February 2008, Ginóbili scored 34 points and recorded 15 rebounds in a 93–88 win over the Toronto Raptors, becoming the first guard in Spurs' history to have at least 15 points and 15 rebounds in a game. On 21 April 2008, the NBA announced that Ginóbili had won the 2008 Sixth Man Award, winning 123 out of the 124 first place votes. Ginobili had a statline of 19.5 points, 4.5 assists, and 4.8 rebounds on .460 shooting averaging 31.1 minutes. Only a couple of weeks later, the Argentine was also named to the All-NBA Third Team. In the playoffs, the Spurs defeated the Suns 4–1 in the first round, Ginóbili was moved to the starting lineup in the second round against the New Orleans Hornets after the Spurs lost the first two road games. San Antonio eventually prevailed in seven games, the Argentine played another strong series, leading the Spurs in points and assists per game (21.3 and 6.0 respectively). However, San Antonio lost to arch-rivals Los Angeles Lakers in the Conference Finals in five games, and once again failed to capture back-to-back NBA championships.

The following season, Ginóbili was injured for most of the campaign, managing only 44 regular-season games and missing the 2009 NBA Playoffs entirely. San Antonio qualified for the playoffs as the third seed with a 54–28 record, but with an aging supporting cast (Bowen, Michael Finley and Kurt Thomas were all in their late 30s), the Spurs were only considered fringe contenders for the championship. As it turned out, the strong play of Duncan and Tony Parker were not enough to help the Spurs avoid a 4–1 defeat by Dallas, and the Spurs were eliminated in the first round of the playoffs for the first time since 2000.

On 31 October 2009, in a game against the Sacramento Kings, a bat descended onto the court at the AT&T Center, causing a stoppage of play. As the bat flew past, Ginóbili swatted the bat to the ground with his hand. He then carried the creature off the court, earning the applause of the crowd. On 9 April 2010, the Spurs and Ginóbili agreed to a three-year, $39 million contract extension through the 2012–13 season.

In 2010–11, Ginobili was regarded as the key player on his team, and he finished eighth on the NBA MVP ballot following the season. Ginobili was injured in the last game of the regular season. Despite the injury, Manu averaged 20.6 points and 4.2 assists during the team's first-round series against Memphis Grizzlies; however, the Spurs lost the series in six games. Ginóbili was named an NBA All-Star for the second time in his career and also was named to the All-NBA third team.

Later career (2011–2018)
In the lockout-shortened 2011–12 season, Ginóbili helped the Spurs go 50–16. The team advanced to the Western Conference Finals, where they were defeated 4–2 by the Oklahoma City Thunder. In Game Five of the series, Ginóbili scored 34 points.

In 2012–13, the Spurs advanced to the NBA Finals, where they faced the Miami Heat. In the Spurs' Game Five win, Ginóbili scored a season-high 24 points and helped his team take a 3–2 series lead. However, the Spurs went on to lose Games Six and Seven.

On 11 July 2013, Ginóbili re-signed with the Spurs on a two-year deal. In 2013–14, the Spurs had a league-best 62–20 record. Ginóbili finished third in the voting for Sixth Man of the Year. In game 1 of the Western Conference Finals against the Thunder, the Big Three of Duncan, Parker and Ginóbili notched their 110th career playoff win, matching the number of playoff wins attained by Magic Johnson, Kareem Abdul-Jabbar and Michael Cooper of the Los Angeles Lakers. The Spurs reached the NBA Finals again, where they faced the Heat for the second year in a row. This time, they dominated the series, winning 4–1 to claim that franchise's fifth championship; Ginóbili won his fourth championship as a Spur.

On 20 July 2015, Ginóbili re-signed with the Spurs. On 14 January 2016, in a win over the Cleveland Cavaliers, Ginóbili played his 900th NBA game, all with the Spurs. On 4 February, he underwent surgery after suffering a testicular injury in the Spurs' win over the New Orleans Pelicans the previous night. He was subsequently sidelined for one month. He returned to the action on 5 March after missing 12 games with the injury, scoring 22 points in 15 minutes against the Sacramento Kings.

On 14 July 2016, Ginóbili re-signed with the Spurs. On 9 November 2016, in a loss to the Houston Rockets, Ginóbili became the 15th second-rounder to reach 13,000 points and joined Rashard Lewis as the only second round draft picks in NBA history with 13,000 career points and at least 1,300 three-pointers.

In game 5 of the 2017 Western Conference Semifinals against Houston, Ginóbili blocked James Harden's shot in the closing seconds to help San Antonio to a 110–107 victory. In game 3 of the Western Conference Finals against Golden State Warriors, Ginóbili became the first player at the age of 39 to score 20 or more points off the bench in a playoff game since the NBA began recording starts in the 1970–71 NBA season.

On 24 August 2017, Ginóbili re-signed with the Spurs. In January 2018, he became the only player in NBA history to have multiple 20-point games off the bench at age 40 or older. He also became the first player in his 40s to score 15-plus points in back-to-back games since Michael Jordan in 2002–03. On 28 January against the Sacramento Kings, Ginóbili and Vince Carter scored 21 and 15 points respectively; it was the first game in NBA history where two players over the age of 40 scored 15 points or more. On 29 March 2018, in a 103–99 win over the Thunder, Ginobili became the Spurs' career leader in steals, passing David Robinson (1,388) for the franchise record. In game 4 of the Spurs' first round playoff series against the Warriors, Ginóbili played in his 217th playoff game, breaking a tie with Shaquille O'Neal for sixth in league history. Ginóbili also passed Reggie Miller for third in career 3-pointers in playoff history. The Spurs lost to the Warriors in five games.

On 27 August 2018, Ginóbili announced his retirement from professional basketball, making him the second player that season to complete a career with one team, after Nick Collison of the Oklahoma City Thunder. On 28 March 2019, the Spurs retired Ginóbili's No. 20 jersey, right next to the No. 21 jersey of Tim Duncan.

Career statistics
Source: Basketball Reference.

NBA

Regular season

|-
| style="text-align:left;background:#AFE6BA;"|†
| style="text-align:left;"|San Antonio
| 69 || 5 || 20.7 || .438 || .345 || .737 || 2.3 || 2.0 || 1.4 || .2 || 7.6
|-
| style="text-align:left;"|
| style="text-align:left;"|San Antonio
| 77 || 38 || 29.4 || .418 || .359 || .802 || 4.5 || 3.8 || 1.8 || .2 || 12.8
|-
| style="text-align:left;background:#AFE6BA;"|†
| style="text-align:left;"|San Antonio
| 74 || 74 || 29.6 || .471 || .376 || .803 || 4.4 || 3.9 || 1.6 || .4 || 16.0
|-
| style="text-align:left;"|
| style="text-align:left;"|San Antonio
| 65 || 56 || 27.9 || .462 || .382 || .778 || 3.5 || 3.6 || 1.6 || .4 || 15.1
|-
| style="text-align:left;background:#AFE6BA;"|†
| style="text-align:left;"|San Antonio
| 75 || 36 || 27.5 || .464 || .396 || .860 || 4.4 || 3.5 || 1.5 || .4 || 16.5
|-
| style="text-align:left;"|
| style="text-align:left;"|San Antonio
| 74 || 23 || 31.0 || .460 || .401 || .860 || 4.8 || 4.5 || 1.5 || .4 || 19.5
|-
| style="text-align:left;"|
| style="text-align:left;"|San Antonio
| 44 || 7 || 26.8 || .454 || .330 || .884 || 4.5 || 3.6 || 1.5 || .4 || 15.5
|-
| style="text-align:left;"|
| style="text-align:left;"|San Antonio
| 75 || 21 || 28.7 || .441 || .377 || .870 || 3.8 || 4.9 || 1.4 || .3 || 16.5
|-
| style="text-align:left;"|
| style="text-align:left;"|San Antonio
| 80 || 79 || 30.3 || .433 || .349 || .871 || 3.7 || 4.9 || 1.5 || .4 || 17.4
|-
| style="text-align:left;"|
| style="text-align:left;"|San Antonio
| 34 || 7 || 23.3 || .526 || .413 || .871 || 3.4 || 4.4 || .7 || .4 || 12.9
|-
| style="text-align:left;"|
| style="text-align:left;"|San Antonio
| 60 || 0 || 23.2 || .425 || .353 || .796 || 3.4 ||4.6 || 1.3 || .2 || 11.8
|-
| style="text-align:left;background:#AFE6BA;"|†
| style="text-align:left;"|San Antonio
| 68 || 3 || 22.8 || .469 || .349 || .851 || 3.0 ||4.3 || 1.0 || .3 || 12.3
|-
| style="text-align:left;"|
| style="text-align:left;"|San Antonio
| 70 || 0 || 22.7 || .426 || .345 || .721 || 3.0 || 4.2 || 1.0 || .3 || 10.5
|-
| style="text-align:left;"|
| style="text-align:left;"|San Antonio
| 58 || 0 || 19.6 || .453 || .391 || .813 || 2.5 || 3.1 || 1.1 || .2 || 9.6 
|-
| style="text-align:left;"|
| style="text-align:left;"|San Antonio
| 69 || 0 || 18.7 || .390 || .392 || .804 || 2.3 || 2.7 || 1.2 || .2 || 7.5 
|-
| style="text-align:left;"|
| style="text-align:left;"|San Antonio
| 65 || 0 || 20.0 || .434 || .333 || .840 || 2.2 || 2.5 || .7 || .2 || 8.9 
|- class="sortbottom"
| style="text-align:center;" colspan="2"|Career
| 1,057 || 349 || 25.4 || .447 || .369 || .827 || 3.5 || 3.8 || 1.3 || .3 || 13.3
|- class="sortbottom"
| style="text-align:center;" colspan="2"|All-Star
| 2 || 0 || 21.0 || .385 || .000 || .833 || 3.0 || 3.0 || 2.0 || .5 || 7.5

Playoffs

|-
| style="text-align:left;background:#AFE6BA;"|2003†
| style="text-align:left;"|San Antonio
| 24 || 0 || 27.5 || .386 || .384 || .757 || 3.8 || 2.9 || 1.7 || .4 || 9.4
|-
| style="text-align:left;"|2004
| style="text-align:left;"|San Antonio
| 10 || 0 || 28.0 || .447 || .286 || .818 || 5.3 || 3.1 || 1.7 || .1 || 13.0
|-
| style="text-align:left;background:#AFE6BA;"|2005†
| style="text-align:left;"|San Antonio
| 23 || 15 || 33.6 || .507 || .438 || .795 || 5.8 || 4.2 || 1.2 || .3 || 20.8
|-
| style="text-align:left;"|2006
| style="text-align:left;"|San Antonio
| 13 || 11 || 32.8 || .484 || .333 || .839 || 4.5 || 3.0 || 1.5 || .5 || 18.4
|-
|style="text-align:left;background:#AFE6BA;"|2007†
| style="text-align:left;"|San Antonio
| 20 || 0 || 30.1 || .401 || .384 || .836 || 5.5 || 3.7 || 1.7 || .2 || 16.7
|-
| style="text-align:left;"|2008
| style="text-align:left;"|San Antonio
| 17 || 6 || 32.9 || .422 || .373 || .896 || 3.8 || 3.9 || .6 || .3 || 17.8
|-
| style="text-align:left;"|2010
| style="text-align:left;"|San Antonio
| 10 || 10 || 35.2 || .414 || .333 || .866 || 3.7 || 6.0 || 2.6 || .2 || 19.4
|-
| style="text-align:left;"|2011
| style="text-align:left;"|San Antonio
| 5 || 5 || 34.8 || .443 || .321 || .780 || 4.0 || 4.2 || 2.6 || .6 || 20.6
|-
| style="text-align:left;"|2012
| style="text-align:left;"|San Antonio
| 14 || 2 || 27.9 || .448 || .338 || .857 || 3.5 || 4.0 || .7 || .3 || 14.4
|-
| style="text-align:left;"|2013
| style="text-align:left;"|San Antonio
| 21 || 3 || 26.7 || .399 || .302 || .738 || 3.7 || 5.0 || 1.1 || .3 || 11.5
|-
|style="text-align:left;background:#AFE6BA;"|2014†
| style="text-align:left;"|San Antonio
| 23 || 0 || 25.5 || .439 || .390 || .862 || 3.3 || 4.1 || 1.6 || .1 || 14.3
|-
| style="text-align:left;"|2015
| style="text-align:left;"|San Antonio
| 7 || 0 || 18.7 || .349 || .364 || .783 || 3.4 || 4.6 || .6 || .9 || 8.0
|-
| style="text-align:left;"|2016
| style="text-align:left;"|San Antonio
| 10 || 0 || 19.2 || .426 || .429 || .783 || 2.7 || 2.5 || .8 || .3 || 6.7
|-
| style="text-align:left;"|2017
| style="text-align:left;"|San Antonio
| 16 || 1 || 17.8 || .412 || .225 || .739 || 2.4 || 2.4 || 1.0 || .1 || 6.6
|-
| style="text-align:left;"|2018
| style="text-align:left;"|San Antonio
| 5 || 0 || 21.4 || .405 || .333 || .818 || 3.0 || 3.2 || 1.4 || .2 || 9.0
|- class="sortbottom"
| style="text-align:center;" colspan="2"|Career
| 218 || 53 || 27.9 || .433 || .358 || .817 || 4.0 || 3.8 || 1.3 || .3 || 14.0

EuroLeague

|-
| style="text-align:left;background:#AFE6BA;"|2000–01†
| style="text-align:left;"|Kinder Bologna
| 22 || 20 || 29.7 || .445 || .291 || .778 || 4.1 || 2.0 || 2.9 || .3 || 15.2 || 15.9
|-
| style="text-align:left;"|2001–02
| style="text-align:left;"|Kinder Bologna
| 22 || 22 || 28.4 || .450 || .340 || .778 || 3.8 || 3.0 || style="background:#CFECEC;"| 2.5* || .3 || 15.9 || 17.1
|- class="sortbottom"
| style="text-align:center;" colspan="2"|Career
| 44 || 42 || 29.1 || .448 || .315 || .778 || 4.0 || 2.5 || 2.7 || .3 || 15.5 || 16.5

Post-playing career
On 24 September 2021, the San Antonio Spurs announced that they had appointed Ginóbili as Special advisor to basketball operations.

On the 10th of September 2022 Ginóbili became the 12th player to have played for the San Antonio Spurs franchise to be inducted into the Naismith Memorial Basketball Hall of Fame. Ginóbili however is one of only four Spurs players to be inducted who played exclusively for San Antonio for their entire NBA career the others being fellow 2022 inductee George Karl, David Robinson and Tim Duncan. Former teammate Tim Duncan presented Ginóbili at the HoF ceremony. Ginóbili joins fellow 2022 inductee George Karl as being one of only five players of the twelve elected to the Hall of Fame to play five or more seasons with The Spurs the others being George Gervin, Tim Duncan, and David Robinson.

National team career
Ginóbili was a core member of a hugely successful Argentina national basketball team, which is sometimes referred to as the Golden Generation.

Ginóbili played with the junior Argentina national team at the 1997 FIBA Under-21 World Championship, where his team finished in 4th place. Ginóbili was a member of the senior Argentina national basketball team, and made his senior debut during the 1998 FIBA World Championship in Athens. He also played at the 2002 FIBA World Championship, where he won a silver medal. His best accomplishment as a member of the national team came at the 2004 Athens Summer Olympics when Argentina became the first team other than Team USA to win the gold medal in 16 years. The highlight of the tournament was his game-winning buzzer beater with 0.7 seconds remaining, on the opening day of the Olympics, in a game versus Serbia and Montenegro. Ginóbili led the team in both scoring (19.3 points per game) and assists (3.3 assists per game).

He played with Argentina at the 2006 FIBA World Championship, where his team finished in 4th place. Ginóbili was the flag bearer for Argentina at the opening ceremony of the 2008 Summer Olympics, which was held in Beijing, China. At the 2008 Beijing Summer Olympics basketball tournament, Ginóbili's Argentina defeated Lithuania to win the bronze medal game, although the shooting guard did not play in that match, after sustaining an injury in the tournament's semifinals. In April 2010, Ginóbili announced that he would not participate in the 2010 FIBA World Championship, due to family reasons. He did however compete for the team at the 2012 London Summer Olympics, where Argentina narrowly missed out on winning the bronze medal, in the bronze medal game versus Russia. He played his last international games at the 2016 Rio Summer Olympics, where Argentina finished in 8th place.

Player profile
Ginóbili was listed as 6 ft 6 in (1.98 m) in shoes, weighed 205 lb (93 kg) and played left-handed. He established himself as a star shooting guard and became known as one of the greatest sixth men in NBA history. He was a relatively late bloomer, entering the NBA at age 25 in a period when entering the NBA as a teenager was very common. He was known as a reliable and versatile backcourt player.

Apart from his up-tempo and aggressive style, Ginóbili was known for his clutch play. Ginóbili's go-to move was either a 3-pointer or a fierce drive to the basket. He often lowered his head when driving to the basket to collapse defenses and create shots or passes to his teammates. Ginobili popularized the Euro step in the NBA, although he was not the first to use the move in the league.

Ginobili was known as a team player. He accepted the Spurs coaches' decision to bring him off the bench for most of his career. He was also known for his difficult-to-defend passes, including the no-look pass. Ginobili was also willing to draw charges on defense. In 2007, he was listed by ESPN writer Thomas Neumann at No. 6 on the list of greatest floppers in NBA history. Five years later, Ian Thomsen, a Sports Illustrated columnist, grouped Ginóbili with fellow European league players Anderson Varejão and Vlade Divac as the players who "made [flopping] famous", by exaggerating contact on the court in a manner analogous to diving in soccer games.

Having traversed the major basketball continents during his career, Ginóbili is one of the few players who enjoyed success under both the physical, one-on-one play of the NBA and the more technical, jump-shooting rule set of FIBA. He is one of only two players in basketball history (along with Bill Bradley) to win the EuroLeague, an Olympic gold medal, and an NBA championship ring. He is also the first non-U.S. player to win both the NBA championship ring and the Olympic gold medal, and the second Latin American to be selected to play in an NBA All-Star game (after Panama's Rolando Blackman). The Spurs made the NBA playoffs in each of Ginobili's 16 NBA seasons.

In 2007, ESPN sportswriter John Hollinger ranked Ginóbili as the sixth-best international player then active in the NBA, describing Ginobili as "one of the great draft heists of all time" and attributing the trend of NBA teams drafting developing European players to the success of the Argentine. The following year, Ginóbili was named by ESPN as one of the best EuroLeague players to have graced the NBA.

Honours

Awards
2× Italian League MVP: 2001, 2002
3× Italian League All-Star: 1999, 2000, 2001
EuroLeague Final Four MVP: 2001
2× EuroLeague Finals Top Scorer: 2001, 2002
FIBA AmeriCup MVP: 2001
FIBA AmeriCup All-Tournament Team: 2011
FIBA Summer Olympic Games MVP: 2004
Italian Cup MVP: 2002
2× FIBA World Cup All-Tournament Team: 2002, 2006
Olimpia de Oro: 2003, 2004 
2× NBA All-Star: 2005, 2011
50 Greatest EuroLeague Contributors: 2008
NBA Sixth Man of the Year Award: 2008
Diamond Konex Award: 2010  
Bleacher Report NBA Legends 100
2× All-NBA Third Team: 2008, 2011
Naismith Memorial Basketball Hall of Fame Inductee: 2022

Titles
Italian League champion: 2001
2× Italian Cup winner: 2001, 2002
EuroLeague champion: 2001
Triple Crown winner: 2001
2× FIBA AmeriCup : 2001, 2011
FIBA World Cup : 2002
4× NBA champion: 2003, 2005, 2007, 2014
Summer Olympic Games : 2004
Summer Olympic Games : 2008
FIBA Diamond Ball Tournament : 2008

Personal honours
 No. 20 retired by the San Antonio Spurs
 Argentina's No. 5 retired by the CABB

Notes

See also

List of National Basketball Association career 3-point scoring leaders
List of National Basketball Association career playoff scoring leaders
List of National Basketball Association career playoff steals leaders
List of National Basketball Association career playoff turnovers leaders
List of National Basketball Association career playoff 3-point scoring leaders
List of National Basketball Association career playoff free throw scoring leaders
List of NBA players who have spent their entire career with one franchise
List of oldest and youngest NBA players

References

External links

  
 Manu Ginóbili at fiba.com
 Manu Ginóbili at euroleague.net
 Manu Ginóbili at legabasket.it 

1977 births
Living people
1998 FIBA World Championship players
2002 FIBA World Championship players
2006 FIBA World Championship players
Argentine expatriate basketball people in Italy
Argentine expatriate basketball people in the United States
Argentine men's basketball players
Argentine people of Italian descent
Argentine people of Marchesan descent
Basketball players at the 1999 Pan American Games
Basketball players at the 2004 Summer Olympics
Basketball players at the 2008 Summer Olympics
Basketball players at the 2012 Summer Olympics
Basketball players at the 2016 Summer Olympics
Estudiantes de Bahía Blanca basketball players
Italian men's basketball players
Lega Basket Serie A players
Medalists at the 2004 Summer Olympics
Medalists at the 2008 Summer Olympics
National Basketball Association All-Stars
National Basketball Association players from Argentina
National Basketball Association players with retired numbers
Olympic basketball players of Argentina
Olympic bronze medalists for Argentina
Olympic gold medalists for Argentina
Olympic medalists in basketball
Pan American Games competitors for Argentina
People with acquired Italian citizenship
San Antonio Spurs draft picks
San Antonio Spurs players
Shooting guards
Sportspeople from Bahía Blanca
Viola Reggio Calabria players
Virtus Bologna players